Alianza Unicachi is a Peruvian football club, playing in the city of Yunguyo, Puno, Peru.

History
Alianza Unicachi is the result of the fusion of the clubs Alianza Porvenir and Deportivo Unicachi.

In the 2010 Copa Perú, the club classified to National Stage but was eliminated by Unión Comercio in the final.

In the 2011 Torneo Intermedio, the club was eliminated by Sporting Cristal in the quarterfinals.

In the 2012 Peruvian Segunda División, the club was relegated to the Copa Perú by economic problems.

Historic Badges

Honours

National
Copa Perú: 0
 Runner-up (1): 2010

Regional
Región VIII: 1
Winners (1): 2010

Liga Departamental de Puno: 1
Winners (1): 2010

Liga Superior de Puno:
Runner-up (1): 2010

Liga Distrital de Yunguyo: 1
Winners (1): 2009 

Liga Distrital de Villa El Salvador: 1
Runner-up (1): 2007

See also
List of football clubs in Peru
Peruvian football league system

References

External links
 Official Web
 Los 16 expedientes
 FPF - Sorteo Etapa Nacional de la Copa Perú 2010

Football clubs in Peru
Association football clubs established in 2010